Redi (stylized as REDI) is a shopping centre in Kalasatama, Helsinki, Finland.

Redi was completed in September 2018. Redi was designed by architect Pekka Helin. The shopping center is part of the Redi complex, which includes the highest residential building in Finland, the 134-meter and 35-storey Majakka. The complex is estimated to cost over one billion euros.

The shopping center is divided into two parts, named Stadi and Sköne. At the street level, the street Kalasatamankatu, running in north–south direction, demarcates the division. The Kalasatama metro station is located on the third floor of the center and is directly accessible from Redi.

Redi's visitor amounts faded following the opening of the mall on September 20, 2018.

Shops and services 
Redi has 175 shops in a total of about 200 business spaces. The largest stores are K-Supermarket, Lidl, Clas Ohlson, H&M and Halonen. The shopping centre has a total of 43 restaurants and cafes. On the ground floor there are several restaurants serving a variety of fast-food, plus an on-street Food Market, which consists of several restaurants.

The first cinemas of the Estonian movie theater chain Cinamon in Finland are located in Redi.

On the roof of the shopping centre there is an open park, Bryga, which is the size of the Esplanadi park in Helsinki.

Name 
In Finnish, "Redi" means a sheltered anchoring place in front of a harbor.

See also 
 Hertsi
 Mall of Tripla

References 

Shopping centres in Helsinki